Ghost marriage is a tradition in several cultures. Examples include:

 Chinese ghost marriage
 Ghost marriage in South Sudan
 Posthumous marriage
 German posthumous marriage

See also
 Levirate marriage